Jumada may refer to:

 Jumada al-awwal, the fifth month of the Islamic calendar
 Jumada al-thani, the sixth month of the Islamic calendar